Starksia melasma, the black spot blenny, is a species of labrisomid blenny known only from reefs around Desecheo Island, Puerto Rico and St. Croix, U.S. Virgin Islands.

References

melasma
Fish described in 2003